Kachu Pukur is a census town in the Habibpur CD block in the Malda Sadar subdivision of Malda district in the Indian state of West Bengal.

Geography

Location

Area overview
The area shown in the adjacent map covers two physiographic regions – the Barind in the east and the tal in the west. The eastern part is comparatively high (up to 40 metres above mean sea level at places) and uneven. The soils of the eastern region are “hard salty clays of a reddish hue and the ground is baked hard as iron.” It lies to the east of the Mahananda River. The area lying to the west of the Mahananda River, the tal, is a flat low land and “is strewn with innumerable marshes, bils and oxbow lakes.” The tal area is prone to flooding by local rivers. The total area is overwhelmingly rural. There are two important historical/ archaeological sites in the area – Pandua and Jagjivanpur.

Note: The map alongside presents some of the notable locations in the area. All places marked in the map are linked in the larger full screen map.

Demographics
According to the 2011 Census of India, Kachu Pukur had a total population of 5,752, of which 2,793 (52%) were males and 2,779 (48%) were females. Population in the age range 0–6 years was 518. The total number of literate persons in  Kachu Pukur was 4,451 (85.04% of the population over 6 years).

 India census, Kachu Pukur had a population of 5348. Males constitute 51% of the population and females 49%. Kachu Pukur has an average literacy rate of 71%, higher than the national average of 59.5%: male literacy is 77%, and female literacy is 64%. In Kachu Pukur, 12% of the population is under 6 years of age.

Infrastructure
According to the District Census Handbook, Maldah, 2011, Kachu Pukur covered an area of 0.81 km2. The protected water-supply involved overhead tank, tap water from treated sources, tube well/ bore well. It had 1,175 domestic electric connections, 280 road lighting points. Among the medical facilities it had 1 hospital (with 30 beds), 6 medicine shops. Among the educational facilities, it had 3 primary schools, 1 secondary school.

References

Cities and towns in Malda district